Majed Farasani (born January 18, 1984) is a Saudi football player who plays a defender.

References

1984 births
Living people
Saudi Arabian footballers
Al-Orobah FC players
Al-Raed FC players
Al-Hazem F.C. players
Al-Kawkab FC players
Place of birth missing (living people)
Saudi First Division League players
Saudi Professional League players
Saudi Second Division players
Association football defenders